Listening is giving attention to a sound or action. When listening, a person hears what others are saying and tries to understand what it means. The act of listening involves complex affective, cognitive and behavioral processes. Affective processes include the motivation to listen to others; cognitive processes include attending to, understanding, receiving and interpreting content and relational messages; and behavioral processes include responding to others with verbal and nonverbal feedback.

Listening is a skill for creating problems. Poor listening can lead to misinterpretations, thus causing conflict or a dispute. Other causes can be excessive interruptions, inattention, hearing what you want to hear, mentally composing a response, and having a closed mind.

Listening is also linked to memory. According to one study, during a speech some background noises heard by listeners helped them recall some of the information by hearing it again. For example, when a person reads or does something else while listening to music, he or she can recall what that was when hearing the music again later.

Listening also functions rhetorically as a means of promoting the cross-culture communicative discourses. Ratcliffe built her argument upon two incidents in which individuals demonstrated a tendency to refuse the cross-cultural discourses.

What is listening? 

Listening differs from obeying.  A person who receives and understands information or an instruction, and then chooses not to comply with it or not to agree to it, has listened to the speaker, even though the result is not what the speaker wanted. 

Listening begins by hearing a speaker producing the sound to be listened to. A semiotician, Roland Barthes, characterized the distinction between listening and hearing. "Hearing is a physiological phenomenon; listening is a psychological act."  People are always hearing, most of the time subconsciously. Listening is done by choice. It is the interpretative action taken by someone in order to understand, and potentially make sense of, something one hears.

How does one listen? 

Listening may be considered as a simple and isolated process, but it would be far more precise to perceive it as a complex and systematic process. It involves the perception of sounds made by the speaker, of intonation patterns that focus on the information, and of the relevance of the topic under discussion.

According to Barthes, listening can be understood on three levels:  alerting, deciphering, and understanding how the sound is produced and how it affects the listener.

People listen for 45 percent of their time communicating.

Alerting, the first level, involves detection of environmental sound cues. This means that certain places have certain sounds associated with them, for example, any given home. Each home has certain sounds associated with it that makes it familiar and comfortable to the occupant. An intrusion, a sound that is not familiar (e.g., a squeaking door or floorboard, a breaking window) alerts whoever lives there to potential danger.

Deciphering, the second level, involves detecting patterns when interpreting sounds; for example, a child waiting for the sound of his mother's return home. In this scenario the child is waiting to pick up on sound cues (e.g., jingling keys, the turn of the doorknob, etc.) that signal his mother's approach.

Understanding, the third level, means knowing how what one says will affect another. This sort of listening is important in psychoanalysis, the study of the unconscious mind. According to Barthes, the psychoanalyst must suspend judgment while listening to the patient in order to communicate with the latter's unconscious without bias. In the same way, lay listeners must suspend judgment when listening to others.

All three levels of listening function within the same plane, and sometimes all at once. Specifically, the second and third levels, which overlap vastly, can be intertwined in that obtaining, understanding and deriving meaning are part of the same process. In this way anyone, on hearing a doorknob turn (obtaining), can almost automatically assume that someone is at the door (deriving meaning).

Active listening 

Active listening involves listening to whatever is being said, attempting to understand it. It can be described in a lot of ways. Active listening requires good listeners who are attentive, nonjudgmental, non-interrupting. An active listener analyzes what the speaker is saying for hidden messages as well as meanings contained in the verbal communication. An active listener looks for nonverbal messages from the speaker in order to comprehend the full meaning of what is being said. In active listening, one must be willing to hear what is being said and try to understand the meaning of whatever has been said. Multiple benefits can accrue from active listening. Being an active listener enables one to become a more effective listener over time. It also strengthens one's leadership skills in the process.

Active listening is an exchange between two or more individuals. If they are active listeners, the quality of the conversation will be better and clearer. Active listeners connect with each other on a deeper level in their conversations. Active listening can create a deeper, more positive relationship between or among individuals.

Active listening is important in bringing changes in the speaker's perspective. Clinical research and evidence show that active listening is a catalyst in one's personal growth, which enhances personality change and group development. People will more likely listen to themselves if someone else is allowing them to speak and get their message across.

Active listening allows for individuals to be present in a conversation. "Listening is a key factor in cultivating relationships because the more we understand the other person, the more connection we create, as taught in nonviolent-communication Dharma teachings. As someone recently stated, "We should listen harder than we speak.""

In language learning 

Along with speaking, reading and writing, listening is one of the "four skills" of language learning. All language-teaching approaches, except for grammar translation, incorporate a listening component.  Some teaching methods, such as total physical response, involve students simply listening and responding.

A distinction is often made between "intensive listening", in which learners attempt to listen with maximum accuracy to a relatively brief sequence of speech; and "extensive listening", in which learners listen to lengthy passages for general comprehension.  While intensive listening may be more effective for developing specific aspects of listening ability, extensive listening is more effective in building fluency and maintaining learner motivation.

People are usually not conscious of how they listen in their first, or native, language unless they encounter difficulty. A research project focused on facilitating language learning found that L2 (second language) learners, in the process of listening, make conscious use of whatever strategies they unconsciously use in their first language, such as inferring, selective attention or evaluation.

Several factors are activated in speech perception: phonetic quality, prosodic patterns, pausing and speed of input, all of which influence the comprehensibility of listening input. There is a common store of semantic information (single) in memory that is used in both first- and second-language speech comprehension, but research has found separate stores of phonological information (dual) for speech. Semantic knowledge required for language understanding (scripts and schemata related to real-world people, places and actions) is accessed through phonological tagging of whatever language is heard.

In a study involving 93 participants investigating the relationship between second language listening and a range of tasks, it was discovered that listening anxiety played a major factor as an obstacle against developing speed and explicitness in second language listening tasks. Additional research explored whether listening anxiety and comprehension are related, and as the investigators expected they were negatively correlated.

Rhetorical listening

Background 

Krista Ratcliffe contended that much of literacy teaching in the U.S. emphasizes classical Western rhetorical theory that foregrounded speaking and writing but ignored listening. These theories mainly focused on the rhetor’s speech that can persuade the audience. Therefore, the goal of classical rhetoric studies was to address what the audience should listen for, rather than how they listen. Shari Stenberg extended this perspective to explicate the absence of listening in the academe. Western teaching methods maintained the inherited rhetorical Greek noun logos, which means reasoning and logic, while ignoring its verb legein that refers to speaking as well as, in etymological term, to lay down, to listen. Elaborating on this, listening may occur within two different stances: the divided logos and restored logos. Both are different in the way of (re)shaping the functions and outcomes of listening. The hearer listens in the divided logos while simultaneously produces their responses to the speaker. On the other side, within the restored logos, listener exploits the listening time to live in someone’s else experiences, then reflect on, and make meanings to offer a response.

One of the examples of divided logos was Aristotle's theory. Despite its concern with teaching students the oral discourse that mandates listening to produce and analyze enthymemes, listening was displaced and diminished. The attention given to speaking without listening "perpetuates a homogenized mode of speech based on competition rather than dialogue." Ratcliffe attributed this listening neglect to Western cultural biases that are represented as: 1) speaking is gendered as masculine while listening as feminine; 2) Listening is subjugated to ethnicity: white people speak while people of color listen; in other words, in cross-cultural relationships, there is one superior member in the conversation who does not need to listen as closely; 3) Western culture prefers to depend on sight, not auditory, as their primary interpretative trope.

Defining rhetorical listening 

Ratcliffe invited language scholars to consider listening as a new tactic to make meaning and hear the discursive discourses of gender and race and, most importantly, facilitate cross-culture dialogue. Ratcliffe defined rhetorical listening "as a trope for interpretive invention, one that emerges from a space within the logos where listeners may employ their agency." (p. 204)  In other words, listening can be used as a tool to understand the experiences and voices of other people. Therefore, listening is a means of interpreting, reflecting on, and making new meanings. To this end, Ratcliffe argued that rhetorical listening provides a “stance of openness that a person may choose to assume in relation to any person, text, or culture.” As an outcome of this openness, Ratcliffe claimed that rhetorical listening cultivates individuals’ conscious and willingness in a way that promote the communication, especially the cross-cultural one 

Steven Pedersen states that communication suffers when interlocutors harbor stereotypes and prejudices, a practice that causes dis-identification. Rhetorical listening, in contrast, promotes cross-cultural understanding and allows students and teachers to disrupt reciprocal resistance.

Rhetorical listening requires the attendance of individuals’ intentions of seeking understanding. This understanding cannot exist with mere listening. Stenberg cautioned against any expected limitations of interpretation which might be caused by these intentions. Therefore, within rhetorical listening the word understanding inverts to be "standing under." This means standing under all the perspectives so that one can (re) conceptualize his/ her ideas and ethics. Hence, individuals do not listen to accumulate others’ ideas, instead they cultivate these ideas through which they can enhance their language and change their visions that open a new avenue for other responses.

Practicing rhetorical listening in the classroom 

Based on Krista Ratcliffe’s work on rhetorical listening, Meagan Rodgers developed the intent/effect tactic as one way for students to practice rhetorical listening in the English composition classroom. The purpose of applying this tool lies in disrupting racially discriminatory stereotypes and utterances. Rodgers found in her classroom-based research that even if a person does not perceive to be racist, racism or racial stereotypes are subconsciously perpetuated when a majority/dominant group agrees with or laughs at racial differences of a minority group member. Rather than confronting students and jeopardizing their willingness to participate in classroom discussions, the intent/effect strategy invites students to (1) consider numerous perspectives of a statement, and (2) understand that well-meant comments (intent) can be perceived as deleterious (effect) by others.

Another strategy for teachers to practice rhetorical listening and improve cultural sensitivity in the classroom is by applying practices from Deaf Studies. This kind of listening pedagogy requires students (1) to be attentive and reduce distracting noises; (2) share their story, including their cultural background, so that classmates can be familiar with their perspective; (3) engage in “critical dialogue” in order to understand others; and (4) pay attention to their classmates’ body language and the message it sends.

Rhetorical listening in the classroom can also be used to shed more light onto why students are silent. Janice Cools discusses several reasons for silence in the ESL/ELL composition classroom, such as students holding back their wisdom on purpose to avoid being harassed by peers and instructors for giving a wrong answer. The fear and doubt that can result from this type of response might lead to feelings of incompetence and discomfort in an individual and cause them to continue in silence in the classroom. A further reason why students choose silence is because they were taught to be silent, especially at the secondary school level in some cultures, e.g. Puerto Rico. Cools suggests to ask students in writing why they are (not) silent in their classes, "how [they] interpret other students' silences [...] and what a professor should infer from [students'] silence." Students answered that silence can be beneficial as it shows their focus on the material, gives them an opportunity to get to know a different perspective while listening to their peers, and allows them to reflect and process questions. Moreover, discussions can be perceived as interruption because classmates do not have expert knowledge. Cools concludes that silence in the classroom should be appreciated and respected.

See also 

 Hearing
 Appreciative listening
 Auditory agnosia
 Auditory processing disorder
 Dialogic listening
 Informational listening
 Pseudolistening
 Workplace listening

References 

Stenberg, Shari. "Cultivating listening: Teaching from a restored logos." Silence and listening as rhetorical arts (2011): 250-263.

Further reading 

 
 

Cognition
Audiology
Life skills
Interpersonal relationships